Zwack is a surname. Notable people with the surname include:

Henry F. Zwack (born 1952), American lawyer and politician
Karl Zwack, Austrian pair skater
Michael Zwack (1949–2017), American artist
Péter Zwack (1927–2012), Hungarian businessman, investor, philanthropist, and diplomat